The Belper Hirn (litt. "Belp Brain") is a Swiss soft cheese made from cow's milk in the city of Belp.

Maturation
The cheese's main characteristic is the growing layer of mold on its outside.

Cow's-milk cheeses
Swiss cheeses